Arline T. Geronimus is an American public health researcher and a professor of Health Behavior & Health Education at the University of Michigan, as well as a research professor at the University of Michigan's Population Studies Center. Geronimus is known for proposing the weathering hypothesis in 1992, which posits that cumulative racism experienced by black women cause them to experience inferior birth outcomes as their maternal age increases. She has also studied other issues regarding pregnancy, including the effect of teenage childbearing on the mother's economic status and the effect of immigration enforcement raids on low birth weight. Since originating the weathering hypothesis, Geronimus has extended it to implications for health across the life course for men and women in a variety of culturally oppressed, marginalized, or economically exploited social identity groups in the United States. Dr. Geronimus' book, "WEATHERING: The Extraordinary Stress of Ordinary Life in an Unjust Society" is being published by Little Brown in March 2023.

Geronimus received a Bachelor of Arts degree in politics (A.B., 1978) from Princeton University, and a Doctor of Science (Sc.D., 1985) in behavioral sciences from the Harvard University School of Public Health. She is a member of the National Academy of Medicine of the National Academies of Science.

References

External links
Geronimus' faculty page at the Population Studies Center
Geronimus' faculty page at the University of Michigan School of Public Health
Racism's Hidden Toll, a Pacific Standard article about Geronimus' research
CV for Arline Geronimus at Population Studies Center, University of Michigan

Living people
University of Michigan faculty
People in public health
Harvard School of Public Health alumni
Year of birth missing (living people)